Inodrillia is a genus of sea snails, marine gastropod mollusks in the family Horaiclavidae.

It was previously included within the subfamily Crassispirinae, family Turridae.

Species
Species within the genus Inodrillia include:
 Inodrillia acloneta (Dall, 1889)
 Inodrillia acova Bartsch, 1943
 Inodrillia acrybia (Dall, 1889)
 Inodrillia aepynota (Dall, 1889)
 Inodrillia amblytera (Bush, 1893)
 Inodrillia avira Bartsch, 1943
 Inodrillia dalli (Verrill & Smith, 1882)
 Inodrillia dido Bartsch, 1943
 Inodrillia gibba Bartsch, 1943
 Inodrillia hatterasensis Bartsch, 1943
 Inodrillia hesperia Bartsch, 1943
 Inodrillia hilda Bartsch, 1943
 Inodrillia ino Bartsch, 1943
 Inodrillia martha Bartsch, 1943
 Inodrillia miamia Bartsch, 1943
 Inodrillia nucleata (Dall, 1881)
 Inodrillia pharcida (Dall, 1889)
 Inodrillia prolongata (E. A. Smith, 1890)
 Inodrillia ricardoi Rios, 2009
 Inodrillia vetula Bartsch, 1943
 † Inodrillia whitfieldi Martin 1904
Species brought into synonymy
 Inodrillia carpenteri (Verrill & Smith [in Verrill], 1880): synonym of Cymatosyrinx carpenteri (Verrill & S. Smith [in Verrill], 1880)
 Inodrillia cestrota (Dall, 1889): synonym of Inodrillia dalli (Verrill & S. Smith [in Verrill], 1882)
 Inodrillia ustickei Nowell-Usticke, 1959: synonym of Neodrillia cydia Bartsch, 1943
 Inodrillia vinki Jong & Coomans, 1988: synonym of Splendrillia vinki (De Jong & Coomans, 1988)

References

External links
 De Jong K.M. & Coomans H.E. (1988) Marine gastropods from Curaçao, Aruba and Bonaire. Leiden: E.J. Brill. 261 pp. 

 
Horaiclavidae
Gastropod genera